Emma Bell Miles (October 19, 1879 – March 19, 1919) was a writer, poet, and artist whose works capture the essence of the natural world and the culture of southern Appalachia.

Early life and education
Miles was born Emma Bell in Evansville, Indiana on October 19, 1879. Her parents, Benjamin Franklin and Martha Ann Mirick Bell, were both schoolteachers. Emma's early childhood was spent in Rabbit Hash, Kentucky, a small town on the Ohio River near Cincinnati. When she was nine, her family moved to the area that is now Red Bank, Tennessee and then to Walden's Ridge (now Signal Mountain), Tennessee.

A talented young woman, she left home to study art in St. Louis, Missouri. Homesickness forced her to return to Walden's Ridge after only two years.  There she fell in love with George Franklin Miles, (known as Frank) and, only three weeks after her mother's death,  married him in spite of her family's opposition.

Emma and Frank had five children, twin daughters Jean and Judith in 1902, Joe in 1905, Katharine “Kitty” in 1907, and Frank Mirick “Mark” in 1909. Emma was devastated in 1913 when Frank Mirick died from scarlet fever.

Career as writer

Emma and Frank struggled to make ends meet and often their major source of income was from Emma's short stories and poems. She also made money selling her art, often in the form of small items such as greeting cards. In 1904 Emma sold her first poem to Harper's Monthly.  An eleven-verse poem titled “The Difference,” appeared in the March issue.  She followed that up the next month with another poem, “Homesick,” written when she was living in St. Louis.  Emma's major success was The Spirit of the Mountains published in 1905. This genre-defying book has elements of local color, short story, travel narrative, personal memoir, and cultural analysis. The music chapter in Spirit of the Mountains was first published in 1904 as an article titled “Some Real American Music” in Harper's Monthly. It was probably the first appreciation of Appalachian music to appear in a popular magazine, and it was certainly one of the first to appear anywhere at all, following by only four years the early academic writing on the subject by William Wells Newell in the Journal of American Folklore.  She also wrote articles for local newspapers, the most popular of which were entitled The Fountain Square Conversations, a fanciful series in which birds gather at a fireman's memorial fountain in downtown Chattanooga and have philosophical conversations on life. Emma's book, Our Southern Birds, was published in 1922. Her journals also contain several references to manuscripts of other works,  including The Good Gray Mother and Our Southern Flowers,  that were never published and have not been located. Emma's poetry, journals, and short stories were later published in Strains from a Dulcimore (1930),  Once I Too Had Wings: The Journals of Emma Bell Miles, 1908-1918 (2014), and  The Common Lot and Other Stories: The Published Short Fiction, 1908-1921 (2016).

Emma and Frank had a difficult marriage. They and their children often suffered from poverty and hunger, and Emma was sometimes bitter about Frank's inability to find paying work to support the family. At one point she notes in her journal that her daughter, Jean, had run away and then she adds “I don't blame her.”       Emma and Frank separated a number of times, and during these times Emma lived in the Francis Willard Home for Women in Chattanooga, in order to make money in town.  Emma proved to be a darling of society, and she often gave lectures which were highly regarded and well received. Emma also held the post of writer-in-residence at Lincoln Memorial University in Harrogate, Tennessee for one term.  Yet no matter how much Emma enjoyed the intellectual life of the city, she always returned to her simple life on the mountain with her husband.

For two months in 1914 Emma had a salary from the Chattanooga News and she was able to pay all of the family's bills. But life in the city would have been unbearable without weekends in the country and that June she became pregnant and had to give up the job. She wrote in her journal “All is lost now; my hope, my health all sacrificed to a man's pleasure...”  She later adds “I have tried every way to escape what is coming, but for some reason the usual methods failed. Frank is kinder and more reasonable than he has ever been, and very sorry for what he has done...” Then, in August, she miscarried the baby.  She had planned to return to her job at the Chattanooga News to pay back the hospital bills but, she notes in her journal, “this Frank positively refuses to let me do.”

This life of continual poverty and the death of 3-year-old Frank Mirick eroded Emma Bell Miles's health. In 1915 she had been diagnosed with tuberculosis and, after spending several years in the Pine Breeze Sanitarium in Chattanooga she died in a small house Frank had rented in what is now North Chattanooga. By this time her husband and the younger children were living with his parents while the twins, Jean and Judith, had been sent away to school. Emma Bell Miles died on March 19, 1919, and was buried in a simple grave in Red Bank, Tennessee.

Legacy
Grace Toney Edwards gave a talk on her at the Glencoe Mansion in 2017.

Bibliography

References

External links 
    "Some Real American Music" by Emma Bell Miles in Harper's Magazine: (1904), Volume 109. Google Books. 
 Some Real American Music -- Reexamined Article about Miles' pioneering writing on American folk music, "Some Real American Music."
Emma Bell Miles Southern Appalachia art, correspondence, and journals, University of Tennessee at Chattanooga Digital Collection

1879 births
1919 deaths
American women short story writers
American short story writers
American women poets
Writers from Evansville, Indiana
People from Red Bank, Tennessee
Writers from Tennessee
People from Signal Mountain, Tennessee
Burials in Tennessee